The third round of CAF matches for 2018 FIFA World Cup qualification was played from 7 October 2016 to 14 November 2017.

Format
A total of 20 teams which had advanced from the second round were drawn into five groups of four teams to play home-and-away round-robin matches. The winners of each group qualified for the 2018 FIFA World Cup.

Seeding
The draw for the third round was held on 24 June 2016, 17:00 EET (UTC+2), at the CAF headquarters in Cairo, Egypt.

The seedings – initially released on 8 June 2016 – were based on a special edition of the FIFA World Rankings that included all matches up to 7 June 2016. This allowed the rankings to include results of the Africa Cup of Nations qualification games played between 3–5 June 2016. However, following a complaint by the Egyptian Football Association, it was reported that a further special ranking would be used. This seeding was released on 21 June. Following further complaints, the Emergency Bureau for the FIFA World Cup Qualifiers reversed the change, and restored the initial special rankings.

Pot 1 contained the teams ranked 1–5.
Pot 2 contained the teams ranked 6–10.
Pot 3 contained the teams ranked 11–15.
Pot 4 contained the teams ranked 16–20.

Each group contained one team from each of the four pots. The fixtures of each group were decided based on the respective draw position of each team, which was decided by drawing a ball with position numbers 1–4.

Note: Bolded teams qualified for the World Cup.

Groups

Group A

Group B

Group C

Group D

Group E

Goalscorers
There were 144 goals scored in 61 matches, for an average of  goals per match.

5 goals

 Mohamed Salah

4 goals

 Préjuce Nakoulma
 Khalid Boutaïb

3 goals

 Richmond Boakye
 Thomas Partey
 Victor Moses
 Youssef Msakni
 Brian Mwila

2 goals

 Yacine Brahimi
 Banou Diawara
 Alain Traoré
 Vincent Aboubakar
 Nuno Rocha
 Garry Rodrigues
 Cédric Bakambu
 Jonathan Bolingi
 Neeskens Kebano
 Dieumerci Mbokani
 Ndombe Mubele
 Abdallah El Said
 Naby Keïta
 Seydou Doumbia
 Hakim Ziyech
 Kelechi Iheanacho
 Alex Iwobi
 John Obi Mikel
 Cheikh N'Doye
 Diafra Sakho
 Percy Tau
 Collins Mbesuma
 Patson Daka

1 goal

 Nabil Bentaleb
 Hillal Soudani
 Issoufou Dayo
 Bertrand Traoré
 André-Frank Zambo Anguissa
 Benjamin Moukandjo
 Clinton N'Jie
 Franck Pangop
 Banana Yaya
 Marvin Baudry
 Thievy Bifouma
 Arnold Bouka Moutou
 Férébory Doré
 Vladis-Emmerson Illoy-Ayyet
 Yannick Bolasie
 Chancel Mbemba
 Paul-José M'Poku
 Shikabala
 Mario Lemina
 Axel Méyé
 Edwin Gyasi
 Alkhaly Bangoura
 Demba Camara
 Keita Karamokoba
 Seydouba Soumah
 Maxwel Cornet
 Gervinho
 Max Gradel
 Jonathan Kodjia
 Hamdou Elhouni
 Ali Elmusrati
 Motasem Sabbou
 Akram Zuway
 Sambou Yatabaré
 Fayçal Fajr
 Medhi Benatia
 Nabil Dirar
 Achraf Hakimi
 Mimoun Mahi
 Odion Ighalo
 John Ogu
 Moses Simon
 Keita Baldé
 Sadio Mané
 Kara Mbodji
 Opa Nguette
 Ismaïla Sarr
 Moussa Sow
 Dean Furman
 Thulani Hlatshwayo
 Andile Jali
 Tokelo Rantie
 Thulani Serero
 Sibusiso Vilakazi
 Themba Zwane
 Aymen Abdennour
 Anice Badri
 Mohamed Ben Amor
 Änis Ben-Hatira
 Ghailene Chaalali
 Wahbi Khazri
 Yassine Meriah
 Milton Karisa
 Farouk Miya
 Emmanuel Okwi
 Enock Mwepu

1 own goal

 Wilfred Moke (against Tunisia)
 Ousmane Sidibé (against DR Congo)
 Salif Coulibaly (against Ivory Coast)
 Thamsanqa Mkhize (against Senegal)

Notes

References

External links

Qualifiers – Africa: Round 3, FIFA.com
2018 FIFA World Cup Russia – Qualifiers, CAFonline.com

3
Qual
Tunisia at the 2018 FIFA World Cup
Nigeria at the 2018 FIFA World Cup
Morocco at the 2018 FIFA World Cup
Senegal at the 2018 FIFA World Cup
Egypt at the 2018 FIFA World Cup